Abdul Latif Ahmadi is an Afghan film director, also known as Engineer Latif Ahmadi. He co-founded Afghanistan’s first private film production company Ariana Films (with Toryalai Shafaq and Juwansher Haidary), and became the president of Afghan Film, the state-run Afghan film company.

As the head of Afghan Film, he has been credited with assisting many of the recent films being produced in Afghanistan such as Buzkashi Boys, The Black Tulip and The Kite Runner as well as traveling around the world to introduce Afghan cinema to various audiences.

In early 2021, he was interviewed about Afghan Film, the feature films he has directed and the history of filmmaking in Afghanistan for the TVO/Al Jazeera documentary series The Forbidden Reel, a program which also featured filmmaker Siddiq Barmak and actor Yasamin Yarmal (from the 1989 film Epic of Love).

Films 
Films that Ahmadi has been involved with include:
 Gonah
 Farar
 Sabor-e sarbaz
 Parenda hai mahajer
 Eshq-e Pery
 Mazrea Sabz
 Sher aqa wa Sheeren goal
 Gumashtan

as director 
Titles in English from The Forbidden Reel:
 April Revolution
 Patient Soldier 
 Epic of Love (1989) with Yasamin Yarmal, Habib Zorghai, Qader Faroukh and Zarghuna Aram (also known as Hamas-e eshq) 
 Sin
 Green Fields
 The Sculptures are Laughing

References

External links
 MTSA: Reports
 Lemar-Aftaab | www.afghanmagazine.com | July 2004 | Vol 3 | Issues 5 | Photo Essay | Afghan Film: Spring 2004 | By Yama Rahimi

Living people
Afghan film directors
1950 births